Matthew Arther (or Arthur) (18351890) was a Union Navy sailor in the American Civil War and a recipient of the U.S. military's highest decoration, the Medal of Honor, for his actions at the Battles of Fort Henry and Fort Donelson.

Biography
Arther was born in 1835 in Scotland, and joined the US Navy from Boston, Massachusetts in August 1861. During the Battles of Fort Henry and Fort Donelson in February 1862, he performed his duties as signal quartermaster and captain of the ship's bow gun "faithfully, effectively and valiantly". For these actions, he was awarded the Medal of Honor the next year, on July 10, 1863, and was discharged from the Navy two weeks later.

Arther's official Medal of Honor citation reads:
Served on board the U.S.S. Carondelet at the reduction of Forts Henry and Donelson, 6 and 14 February 1862 and other actions. Carrying out his duties as signal quartermaster and captain of the rifled bow gun, S/Q.M. Arther was conspicuous for valor and devotion, serving most faithfully, effectively and valiantly.

See also

List of American Civil War Medal of Honor recipients: A-F

References

External links
 

1835 births
1890 deaths
People of Massachusetts in the American Civil War
Union Navy sailors
United States Navy Medal of Honor recipients
Scottish-born Medal of Honor recipients
American Civil War recipients of the Medal of Honor